The 2017 Giro d'Italia began on 5 May, and stage 11 occurred on 17 May. The race began in Alghero on the island of Sardinia.

Stage 1
5 May 2017 — Alghero to Olbia,

Stage 2
6 May 2017 — Olbia to Tortolì,

Stage 3
7 May 2017 — Tortolì to Cagliari,

Stage 4
9 May 2017 — Cefalù to Etna (Rifugio Sapienza),

Stage 5
10 May 2017 — Pedara to Messina,

Stage 6
11 May 2017 — Reggio Calabria to Terme Luigiane,

Stage 7
12 May 2017 — Castrovillari to Alberobello,

Stage 8
13 May 2017 — Molfetta to Peschici,

Stage 9
14 May 2017 — Montenero di Bisaccia to Blockhaus,

Stage 10
16 May 2017 — Foligno to Montefalco, individual time trial (ITT)

Stage 11
17 May 2017 — Florence (Ponte a Ema) to Bagno di Romagna,

References

Sources

External links
 

2017 Giro d'Italia
Giro d'Italia stages